Multiple biblical characters with the name Hadad (Hadar) existed.

Hadad is the name of the Semitic storm god.
Abraham's son Ishmael had a son named Hadar who was a chief.
Hadad ben Bedad, an early king of Edom.
Hada, the last king of Edom. He ruled from Pau, Edom. Hadad's wife was Queen Mehetabel ("God makes happy"), daughter of Matred and granddaughter of Me-Zahab.
Hadad the Edomite, a member of the royal house of Edom, who married the sister of Pharaoh's wife, Queen Tahpenes, and escaped from a massacre under Joab, fleeing to Egypt.

Notes

Kings of Edom
Ishmaelites
Set index articles on Hebrew Bible people